Cat's ear is the common name for several species of flowering plants:

Hypochaeris species, especially Hypochaeris radicata
 Some Calochortus species, also called mariposa lilies